Darryl Lamon Morrison (born May 19, 1971) is a former American football safety in the National Football League for the Washington Redskins.  He played college football at the University of Arizona and was drafted in the sixth round of the 1993 NFL Draft.

Personal life
Darryl and his wife, JoAnn, have five children. His two sons, Samuel and Benjamin, both play college football. Samuel, played at both Arizona and San Diego State. Benjamin plays cornerback for Notre Dame. All three of his daughters are also college athletes; his daughter Faith was a gymnast at The University of Washington (2013–2016), his daughter Grace was a volleyball player at Appalachian State (2017–2021), and his daughter Naomi is an All-American gymnast at The University of Michigan, and a member of their national championship-winning team in 2021.

Darryl earned a Master’s in Divinity and is now the pastor of a Phoenix church.

References

1971 births
Living people
American football safeties
Arizona Wildcats football players
Washington Redskins players
Players of American football from Phoenix, Arizona